The Xumi Pagoda or Sumeru Pagoda, also known as Summer Pagoda is a Chinese pagoda of the Buddhist Kaiyuan Monastery west of Zhengding, Hebei province, China. This square-base stone and brick pagoda was built in the year 636 AD during the reign of Emperor Taizong of the Tang Dynasty (618-907). It stands at a height of 48 m (157 ft) and has been well preserved since its initial construction. The monastery that once surrounded the pagoda, however, has largely been destroyed, with the exception of a few structures.

The pagoda has nine tiers of eaves and a crowning spire, along with artwork of stone carvings at the corners of the stone platform that makes up its base. The interior of the pagoda is hollow and lacks a staircase to reach the higher floors. Its style of eaves in gradual tiers resembles that of other Tang pagodas, such as the Small Wild Goose and Giant Wild Goose pagodas. Near the arched doorway leading into the pagoda is a colossal stone body of a bixi, a Chinese mythical beast in the shape of a tortoise-like dragon. The left side of the statue had been broken off and missing, until it was found in 2000, during an excavation at a nearby street.

Notes

See also
Chinese architecture
List of Buddhist temples

References
Harper, Damian (2005). Lonely Planet China: 9th Edition. London: Lonely Planet Books. .

External links
The Kaiyuan Temple Pagoda at China.org.cn

Buddhist temples in Hebei
Pagodas in China
Tang dynasty Buddhist temples
7th-century Buddhist temples
Towers completed in the 7th century
630s establishments
7th-century establishments in China
Major National Historical and Cultural Sites in Hebei
Religious buildings and structures completed in 636